Novgorodsky (masculine), Novgorodskaya (feminine), or Novgorodskoye (neuter) is a Russian surname and indicates someone who came from Veliky Novgorod which is one of the oldest cities in Russia. may refer to:

Novgorodsky District, a district of Novgorod Oblast, Russia
Novgorodsky (inhabited locality) (Novgorodskaya, Novgorodskoye), name of several rural localities in Russia
Novgorod Oblast (Novgorodskaya oblast), a federal subject of Russia

People with the surname
Dmitri Novgorodsky (born 1965), Russian pianist

See also
Novgorod (disambiguation)

Russian-language surnames
Toponymic surnames